The 1973 Acropolis Rally (formally the 21st Acropolis Rally) was the sixth round of the inaugural World Rally Championship season.  Run in late-May on the punishing hot gravel roads of central Greece, the Acropolis is a long-standing event on the WRC calendar.

Report 
In 1973, and for several years afterward, only manufacturers were given points for finishes in WRC events.  In Greece, the Alpine Renault team had another strong showing, with their fourth win of the year.  Driver Jean-Luc Thérier became the first driver to win two WRC rallies with his victory here.

Results 

Source: Independent WRC archive

Championship standings after the event

References

External links 
 Official website of the World Rally Championship
 1973 Acropolis Rally at Rallye-info 

Acropolis
Acropolis Rally
Acropolis Rally